Murnan is a surname. Notable people with the surname include:

Joe Murnan (born 1983), English darts player
Monica Murnan (born 1966), American politician

See also
Jean-Bernard Gauthier de Murnan (1748–1796), French military officer

Surnames
Surnames of British Isles origin
Surnames of English origin
English-language surnames